The Band Geek Mafia is Voodoo Glow Skulls' fourth full-length album. It was released on July 14, 1998 on Epitaph Records. All songs were written by Voodoo Glow Skulls except "Stranded in the Jungle", written by James Johnson and Ernestine Smith. The song "Stranded in the Jungle" appears on punk compilation album Punk-O-Rama 5, "They Always Come Back" appears on Punk-O-Rama 4, and "Delinquent Song" appears on Punk-O-Rama 3. The song "Symptomatic" was in ESPN X Games Pro Boarder for the PS1.

Track listing

Personnel
Frank Casillas: Vocal
Eddie Casillas: Guitars
Sam Avila: Organ
Andy Kaulkin: Piano
Krista Panos: Theremin
Joey Hernandez: Sax
Brodie Johnson: Trombone
Joe McNally: Trumpet
Jorge Casillas: Bass
Jerry O'Neill: Drums
Ray Salis: Percussion

References 

Voodoo Glow Skulls albums
1998 albums
Epitaph Records albums
Albums produced by John Avila